Propadienone is an organic compound with molecular formula C3H2O consisting of a propadiene carbon framework with a ketone functional group. The structure of propadienone is not the same as propadiene of carbon suboxide. In propadienone, oxygen has +1 formal charge and C2 carbon has -1 formal charge.

See also
Propadiene
Carbon suboxide

References

Ketones